JDS Wakaba (DE-261) was the former Imperial Japanese Navy ship Nashi, an escort destroyer of the Tachibana sub-class of the  built for the Imperial Japanese Navy during the final stages of World War II. Nashi was sunk in July 1945, but salvaged in 1954 and refitted to join the Japan Maritime Self-Defense Force in 1956 as Wakaba, later being utilised as a radar trials ship, but stricken in 1971 and scrapped in 1972-1973.

Design and description
The Tachibana sub-class was a simplified version of the preceding Matsu class to make them even more suited for mass production. The ships had two Kampon geared steam turbines, each driving one propeller shaft, using steam provided by two Kampon water-tube boilers.

The main armament of the Tachibana sub-class consisted of three Type 89  dual-purpose guns in one twin-gun mount aft and one single mount forward of the superstructure. The single mount was partially protected against spray by a gun shield. They carried a total of 25 Type 96  anti-aircraft guns in 4 triple and 13 single mounts. The accuracy of the Type 89 guns was severely reduced against aircraft because no high-angle gunnery director was fitted. The Tachibanas were equipped with Type 13 early-warning and Type 22 surface-search radars. The ships were also armed with a single rotating quadruple mount amidships for  torpedoes. They could deliver their 60 depth charges via two stern racks and two throwers. Photos of her taken in drydock after her salvage showed that she had been equipped with a ramp at her stern designed to launch midget submarines.

Construction and career
Nashi was launched by Kawasaki, Kobe, on 17 January 1945 and completed on 15 March. She was assigned to Desron 11, Combined Fleet, for training on 15 March 1945. In May 1945 she was assigned to Destroyer Division 52, Cruiser-Destroyer Squadron 31. Nashi escaped an attack on Kure harbour by B-29's on 22 June 1945, but on 28 July 1945 was sunk at Mitajirizaki, Kure by aircraft from Halsey's Task Force 38. Commander Takeda and most of the crew survived. On 15 September 1945, Nashi was officially struck from the Navy list.

The ship was refloated in 1954, and after repair at Kure recommissioned in the JMSDF as Wakaba on 31 May 1956. She was refitted in 1958 for use as a radar trials ship, and sonar was added in 1960. As such she was the only ship of the Imperial Japanese Navy to become part of the post-war Japan Maritime Self-Defense Force, and for some time was the biggest ship in the JMSDF.

Wakaba was struck on 31 March 1971, and scrapped in 1972–1973. 'Nashi' is a type of pear. 'Wakaba' means "Young Leaves" in Japanese, suggesting the "green shoots" of recovery, a symbol of a new start after the war. Additionally, while the name 'Nashi' in the logographic Japanese Kanji script unmistakably means: 'pear' (梨), in the phonetic Japanese script of Hiragana, 'Nashi (なし)' can mean "Not exist".  Therefore to avoid misunderstanding the term: "Not exist" (over radio or other communication) she was renamed.

Notes

References

Further reading
 The Maru Special, Japanese Naval Vessels No.41, Japanese destroyers I, Ushio Shobō (Japan), July 1980
 The Maru Special, Ships of the JMSDF No.71, Escort ship Isuzu-class and Wakaba, Ushio Shobō (Japan), January 1983
 The Maru Special, Ships of the JMSDF No.78, Electric weapons, machineries and helicopters, Ushio Shobō (Japan), January 1983

External links
 Photographs of the salvage and refit of the Nashi 
 Details of TF38 operations including the sinking of the Nashi

Frigates of the Japan Maritime Self-Defense Force
1945 ships
Auxiliary ships of the Japan Maritime Self-Defense Force
Experimental ships
Tachibana-class destroyers
Ships built by Kawasaki Heavy Industries